Music Speaks Louder Than Words (subtitled James Blood Ulmer Plays the Music of Ornette Coleman) is an album by James Blood Ulmer recorded in 1995 and released on the Japanese DIW label.

Reception

Opinions of the album varied. The Allmusic review by Don Snowden awarded the album 1 stars, stating, "what an enormous let-down Music Speaks Louder Than Words is in terms of execution ... Ulmer sounds distracted and disinterested, his guitar lines all introverted thumb mumbles and musings played softer than his acoustic rhythm section (and they're being sensitive) ... What a wasted opportunity". In JazzTimes Bill Milkowski wrote "Blood always sounds best when he’s skronking over the top of a free flowing, interactive and understated rhythm section ... He conjures up that more open-ended vibe on this collection of Ornette Coleman compositions ... when he’s using space dramatically, surfing on top of rolling waves of rhythm, there is no more distinctive and startling sound in jazz guitar. Few other six-stringers can capture the provocative, probing essence and dark beauty of Ornette like Blood". On All About Jazz Glenn Astarita said "This is the recording Ulmer fans have been waiting for. The festivities are celebratory! Ulmer is a talented and unique voice on the guitar. Better yet, he swings! ... A well balanced affair and highly recommended".

Track listing
All compositions by Ornette Coleman except where noted
 "Lonely Woman" – 6:50
 "Elizabeth" – 6:56
 "Sphinx" – 5:39
 "Dance in the Dark - Music Is My Life" (James Blood Ulmer) – 5:33
 "Cherry Cherry" – 7:50
 "I Can't Take It Anymore" (Ulmer) – 2:58
 "Street News" – 7:12
 "Skies of America" – 7:10
 "Rap Man" (Ulmer) – 4:33

Personnel
James Blood Ulmer – guitar
Calvin "Hassēn Truth" Jones – acoustic bass (tracks 1, 3, 5, 7 & 8)
Amin Ali – electric bass (tracks 2 & 4-6)
Rashied Ali (tracks 1, 3, 5 & 7), Aubrey Dale (tracks 2, 4-6 & 9) – drums
Michael Mustafa Ulmer – keyboards (tracks 4, 6 & 9)

References 

1996 albums
James Blood Ulmer albums
DIW Records albums